The Confederate Soldier Monument in Caldwell County, Kentucky is a historic statue located on the Caldwell County Courthouse south lawn in the county seat of Princeton, Kentucky, United States. It was erected in 1912 by the Tom Johnson Chapter No. 886 of the United Daughters of the Confederacy (UDC).

The entire  monument is made of granite; mostly gray granite, but with some white granite. The southward-facing statue has been said to be "defiant", with its back to the North, its defiant gaze, and its proud mustache.

The monument was constructed by John Davis and Sons Marble and Granite Works of Princeton, Kentucky, at a cost of approximately  raised privately by the Tom Johnson UDC chapter and surviving local Confederate veterans.

The statue's inscription reads "C.S.A. In Memory of Confederate Soldiers and the Cause for Which They Fought 1861-1865. Erected by Tom Johnson Chapter UDC". A Confederate battle flag is engraved on the left side of the statue's base.

It was dedicated to a large crowd including surviving local Confederate veterans of Jim Pearce Camp No. 527, United Confederate Veterans, on November 12, 1912. Many businesses in Princeton closed for the ceremony.

On July 17, 1997, the Confederate Soldier Monument of Caldwell County was one of sixty-one different monuments related to the Civil War in Kentucky placed on the National Register of Historic Places, as part of the Civil War Monuments of Kentucky Multiple Property Submission.

The monument is still located outside the courthouse.

References

External links

1912 sculptures
Civil War Monuments of Kentucky MPS
National Register of Historic Places in Caldwell County, Kentucky
Outdoor sculptures in Kentucky
United Daughters of the Confederacy monuments and memorials in Kentucky
1912 establishments in Kentucky
Individually listed contributing properties to historic districts on the National Register in Kentucky
Princeton, Kentucky